This is a list of digital camera brands. Former and current brands are included in this list. With some of the brands, the name is licensed from another company, or acquired after the bankruptcy of an older photographic equipment company.  The actual manufacture of a camera model is performed by a different company in many cases.  In many cases brands are limited to certain countries.  Not all brands of devices that can take digital images are listed here, including many industrial digital camera brands, some webcam brands, brands of cell phones that feature cameras, and brands of video cameras that can take digital stills.  Defunct brands are listed separately.

Active consumer camera brands

, these brands offer some combination of compact digital cameras, bridge camera, digital single-lens reflex cameras (DSLRs), and mirrorless interchangeable lens cameras (MILCs):

Other active brands

These brands offer only non-camera digital imaging devices, or non-consumer digital cameras:

  ABUS - cameras for surveillance and home security applications
  AEE - action camcorders capable of taking stills
  Aiptek - camcorders
  Alcatel - cameraphones
  Alpa - medium format cameras designed for digital backs
  Apple - cameraphones, tablets and webcams; previously offered QuickTake standalone camera
  Arecont Vision - HDTV surveillance IP cameras and software
  Argus (licensed brand name of extinct company)
 AV Future Link Sdn. Bhd. (AVF) - webcams only
  Axis - network cameras / standalone webcams only
  Better Light - digital scan backs
  BlackBerry - cameraphones
  BuckEye Cam - long range wireless camera systems
  Bushnell - trail cameras
 Brica
  Cambo - large format cameras, architectural cameras and repro cameras designed for digital backs
  Contour - wearable HD action cams for video and capable of taking stills
  Covert - trail cameras
  Creative - webcams only; previously offered compact digital cameras
  Cuddeback - trail cameras
  Disk Digitais - professional cameras, semi-professional, plus a hundred in accessories
  D-Link - IP cameras
  EarthCam - webcams only
 Emprex
  Fotoman - medium format cameras designed for digital backs
  GoPro - action/helmet camcorder capable of taking stills
  Hasselblad - medium-format cameras and digital camera backs
  Hitachi - camcorders capable of taking stills; previously offered compact digital cameras
  Horseman - medium format cameras designed for digital backs
  HTC - cameraphones, tablets
  Huawei - cameraphones, tablets
  Hunten - trail cameras
  iPUX - IP cameras
  IQinVision - IP cameras
 Jaga - compact digital cameras
  Jenoptik - industrial optical products; previously offered compact digital cameras
  JVC - camcorders capable of taking stills; previously offered compact digital cameras
  Kaiser - scanning cameras
  Ken-A-Vision - document cameras and digital microscopes offers a built-in digital cameras
  Kyocera as of 2005, only cameraphones; previously offered compact digital cameras
  KUROKESU - Industrial cameras, USB webcameras 
  Leaf - digital camera backs
  Lenovo - cameraphones, tablets
  Leupold - trail cameras
  LG - IP cameras, cameraphones; previously offered compact digital cameras
  Linhof - medium format cameras designed for digital backs
 Livelook - webcams only
  Logitech - webcams only
  Lumenera - industrial, scientific, and astronomy cameras
  Mamiya - medium-format cameras which accept digital camera backs
  Mercury - smartphones; previously offered compact digital cameras
  Microsoft - LifeCam series
  Minox - toy and spy digital cameras, and compact digital cameras
 Micro Innovations
   Mobotix - IP cameras
  Motorola - cameraphones
  Moultrie - trail cameras
  Mustek Systems - camcorders capable of taking stills; previously offered compact digital cameras
  Nintendo - Nintendo 3DS - portable game console features three cameras
  Nokia - cameraphones
 Ocuview - webcam
   Oncam Grandeye - IP cameras
  Oregon Scientific - action/helmet camcorders; previously offered compact digital cameras
  Panoscan - digital panoramic rotating line cameras
  Pantech - cameraphones
  Pentacon - scanning cameras
  Philips - cameraphones and webcams; previously offered compact digital cameras
  Premier
  Primos - trail cameras
  RCA - camcorders capable of taking stills; previously offered compact digital cameras
  Reconyx - trail cameras
  Rencay - digital scan backs
  Samyang Optics - photographic lenses: autofocus lenses, manual focus lenses, DSLRs, cinema lenses (also under Xeen brand)
  ScoutGuard - trail cameras
   Sea & Sea - underwater housings for DSLRs and MILCs; previously offered compact digital cameras
  Seagull Camera - compact cameras
   Seitz - digital panorama cameras
  Sharp - cameraphones; previously offered camcorders capable of taking stills
  Silvestri - medium and large format cameras for traditional and digital photography.
  Sinar - medium-format cameras and digital camera backs
  Soligor
  Spypoint - trail cameras
 Suprema
  Swann - IP cameras and trail cameras
  Tamron - photographic lenses, optical components and commercial/industrial-use optics
  Trust
  Toshiba - camcorders capable of taking stills; previously offered compact digital cameras
   Toyo-View - view cameras designed for digital backs
   Uway - trail cameras
   Wildgame - trail cameras and action cameras
 JETE - Webcam
 Advan - Smartphones
  Zenit - Announced that it was resuming camera and lens production for the M-mount, as well as for unspecified Nikon and Canon mounts in 2019

Defunct brands

These brands no longer produce digital imaging products:

 Apple - compact digital camera
 Acer - compact digital cameras
 Autographer, OMG Life - wearable digital camera
 Chinon - one early digital camera
 Concord - compact digital cameras
 Cool-iCam - compact digital cameras
 Contax - produced one DSLR, several high quality SLR and galileian viewfinder models and two compact digital cameras
 CyberPix
 Gateway - compact digital cameras
 HP Photosmart - compact digital cameras; left market in November 2007
 Imacon - digital camera backs; purchased by Hasselblad
 Intel - produced one compact digital camera
 Konica - compact digital cameras
 Konica Minolta - compact digital cameras and DSLRs; assets relating to digital imaging were transferred to Sony in 2006
 Largan - compact digital cameras
 LG - compact digital cameras
 Minolta - compact digital cameras and two unique DSLRs, acquired by Sony in early 21st century
 Maxell - compact digital cameras
 Microtek - compact digital cameras
 Nintendo - Game Boy Camera - no longer offers digital camera accessory
 Nytech - compact digital cameras
Premo - made cameras in the 1800s. Bought out by Kodak in the early 1900s
 Sanyo - compact digital cameras
 SiPix - compact digital cameras
 UMAX - compact digital cameras
 Voigtländer - fixed-lens film cameras
 Yakumo - compact digital cameras
 Mnyaga - compact digital cameras

See also
 List of photographic equipment makers
 Comparison of digital SLRs
Camera
Digital single-lens reflex camera
History of the camera

References

Digital camera
Digital camera